Bernard Lietaer (7 February 1942 – 4 February 2019) was a Belgian civil engineer, economist, author, and educator. He studied monetary systems and promoted the idea that communities can benefit from creating their own local or complementary currency, which circulate parallel with national currencies.

Early life
Bernard Lietaer was born on 7 February 1942 in Lauwe, Belgium. He attended College of St Paul, Godinne from 1955 to 1961.
He studied engineering at the Catholic University of Leuven, in Belgium, where, later in life, he held an assistant professorship of international finance. During his engineering studies, he was a member of the debating union Olivaint Conference of Belgium. After obtaining his M.Sc. in 1967, he went on to  
continue his studies at the MIT until 1969.

Career
Lietaer's post-graduate thesis, published in 1971, included a description of "floating exchanges". The Nixon Shock of that same year eradicated the Bretton Woods system by decoupling the US dollar from the gold standard and inaugurated an era of "universal floating exchanges". Prior to that time, the only "floating exchanges" involved some Latin American currencies. The techniques which he had developed for marginal, Latin American currencies were for a time the only systematic research that could be used to deal with the major currencies of the world. A US bank negotiated exclusive rights to his approach and Lietaer began another career.

In 1987, he co-founded a currency-management firm, called GaiaCorp, and managed the offshore currency fund "Gaia Hedge II", which during the 1987–1991 period was the world's top performing managed currency fund. His biography cites the Micropal survey of 1,800 off-shore funds.

In the preface to his book The Future of Money: Beyond Greed and Scarcity, Lietaer claimed: "We almost tripled the money in three years". Business Week named him "the world’s top currency trader" in 1992.

From 2003 to 2006, he was a visiting scholar at Naropa University, USA, where he created the university's Marpa Center for Business and Economics.  

While at the Central Bank in Belgium, he implemented the convergence mechanism (ECU) to the single European-currency system. During that period, he also served as President of Belgium's Electronic Payment System.

In an 2007 interview, Lietaer claimed that diversified, internationally valid currencies can help "address specific needs and enable certain exchanges – whether to fight global warming, promote employment or facilitate education and health care."

In 2012, he was co-author, along with Christian Arnsperger, Sally Goerner, and Stefan Brunnhuber, of Money & Sustainability: the missing link, a publication of The Club of Rome, in which he predicted that "the period 2007–2020 [would be] one of financial turmoil and gradual monetary breakdown."

Personal life and death
At the time of his death, Lietaer lived in Hoyerhagen, in northern Germany.

Bibliography
The Future of Money (London: Random House, 2001)
 New Money for a New World (Qiterra Press 2011) (with Stephen Belgin)

 People Money:  The Promise of Regional Currencies (with Margrit Kennedy and John Rogers) (Triarchy Press 2012)
 Money and Sustainability: The Missing Link / A report from the Club of Rome (with Christian Arnsperger, Sally Goerner and Stefan Brunnhuber), Triarchy Press Ltd, 30. May 2012, 
 Rethinking Money: How New Currencies Turn Scarcity into Prosperity (with Jacqui Dunne) (Berrett-Koehler Publishers 2013), 
With Helga Preuss, Marek Hudon, Kristof de Spiegeleer, Dieter Legat & Cary Sherburne: Towards a sustainable world. Delta Institute - Dieter Legat E.U. 2019,

Notes

See also

 ANCAP
 Barter
 Collaborative finance
 Community wealth building
Complementary currencies 
 Credit money  
 Cryptocurrency
 Digital currencies
 Flex dollar
Interest Free Economy 
 Margrit Kennedy
 List of Canadian community currencies
 List of community currencies in the United States
 Local currency
 Local exchange trading system

External links

 Official website (since 2022) with all biographical information and publications: bernard-lietaer.org
 New Money for a New World
 Money and Sustainability: The Missing Link

1942 births
2019 deaths
Belgian economists
Catholic University of Leuven alumni
Freiwirtschaft
Monetary reformers
Naropa University faculty
Academic staff of the Université catholique de Louvain
Members of the European Academy of Sciences and Arts